Grounded with Louis Theroux is a radio and podcast series hosted by Louis Theroux for BBC Radio 4. In each episode, Theroux interviews a different high-profile person whom he has always wanted to talk to. The show was first broadcast during the 2020 COVID-19 lockdown and became the most popular podcast on the BBC Sounds app during this time.

Overview 
Grounded with Louis Theroux is the first podcast series from Theroux. It was first broadcast in April 2020 during the COVID-19 UK lockdown when Theroux could no longer continue with his TV projects and wanted to remain productive. The guests consist of people he had always wanted to talk to, including some who had turned down being interviewed as part of the When Louis Met... series.

The name Grounded is inspired by the COVID-19 lockdown measures that were imposed across the globe. The interviews take place over Zoom with Theroux hosting from his home office, and often feature Theroux experiencing difficulties with the technology.

The podcast episodes last for around an hour, but unedited interviews have lasted up to two and a half hours.

Style 
Theroux was introduced to podcasting in 2013 when listening to, and later appearing on, the interview show WTF with Marc Maron. He also experienced the impact of podcasts after appearing on The Adam Buxton Podcast, describing the medium as being like an "odd space that's somewhere between private and public." Theroux claimed that because the interviews for Grounded took place during the pandemic and lockdown, there was "a background of a shared feeling of confusion and grief" that made guests willing to speak more candidly about difficulties in their life and the audience connect with the material. Theroux stated that he made an effort to keep the conversations reciprocal and often opened up to the guests with his own struggles.

Theroux compared the podcast to his work on TV, stating that podcast conversations were a more controllable format than his documentary interactions. He described his role in the podcast as “a bit more of a tour guide" who guided the conversation "as opposed to a therapist inquisitor".

Production 
Grounded was the first commission for the production company Mindhouse Productions, which was founded in 2019 by Theroux, his wife Nancy Strang, and Aaron Fellow. The podcast was part of a large investment of millions of pounds in original material for the BBC Sounds app. Episodes were made available via the app before being broadcast on BBC Radio 4 the following week. The show was the biggest hit for the app during the COVID-19 UK lockdown between April–June 2020.

Episodes

Series 1

Series 2 
The release of Series 2 of Grounded was announced in November 2020. Whilst promoting the series, Theroux stated "many of us are back in lockdown… but the good news is it’s been timed perfectly to coincide with the release of Grounded season two".

Reception 
Grounded with Louis Theroux was the most listened-to new podcast on Apple Podcasts in 2020. As of May 2021, the podcast has received over 7,500 ratings on Apple Podcasts with an average score of 4.7 out of 5. It won Podcast of the Year in the Heat Unmissables Awards 2020.

James Marriott of The Times gave the podcast five out of five stars calling it "a joy". Fiona Sturges of the Financial Times praised the show's "depth, curiosity and, on occasion, some proper punches to the gut." John Phipps of The Spectator gave a positive account of the events of Series 1 and claimed that this podcast proves that Theroux leaves most of his peers "trailing in the gutter".

References 

BBC Radio 4 programmes
2020 podcast debuts
Louis Theroux
Works about the COVID-19 pandemic